The California Raisin Show is a 1989 American animated television series based on the claymation advertising characters The California Raisins. The show is based on the claymation special, Meet the Raisins!, which originally aired on CBS in 1988. After the show's 13-episode run, a sequel to the original special, Raisins: Sold Out!: The California Raisins II, aired in 1990.

While the characters are traditionally depicted in claymation, the TV show was cel animated by Murakami-Wolf-Swenson. It did, however, maintain Will Vinton as creative director and executive producer. It takes place in a world populated by anthropomorphic fruits and vegetables and focuses on the main characters, the California Raisins: A.C. (vocals), Beebop (drums), Stretch (bass), and Red (guitar/piano). Each episode has one or more musical numbers, all of which were originally performed by most Motown artists.

Cast

 Cam Clarke as Beebop
 Brian Cummings as Lick Broccoli
 Jim Cummings as A.C., Leonard Limabean
 Brian Mitchell as Red
 Dorian Harewood as Stretch, Red ("No Business Like Shoe Business")
 Gaille Heidemann as Shirelle
 Michele Mariana as Lulu Arborman - Ma
 Rebecca Gilchrist as Dixie
 Willard E. Pugh
 Cree Summer as Crystal
 Todd Tolces as Rudy Bagaman

Episodes

DVD release
On November 15, 2011, Hen's Tooth Video released The California Raisins Collection on DVD in Region 1 for the first time. The 2-disc set features all 13 episodes of the series as well as the two original claymation specials, Meet the Raisins! and The Raisins: Sold Out!: The California Raisins II, along with 4 original TV ads.

References

External links
 

1989 American television series debuts
1989 American television series endings
1980s American animated television series
American children's animated adventure television series
American children's animated musical television series
Fruit and vegetable characters
English-language television shows
CBS original programming
Animated musical groups
Television series by CBS Studios
Works based on advertisements
Films shot in Portland, Oregon